On June 25, 2014, the Tenth Circuit Court of Appeals upheld a ruling striking down Utah's same-sex marriage ban, setting a precedent in other states under the Tenth Circuit's jurisdiction. In addition,  on July 18, 2014, the same panel of the Tenth Circuit invalidated Oklahoma's ban as well. Both Circuit Court rulings were stayed pending certiorari review from the Supreme Court of the United States. The Tenth Circuit consists of Colorado, Kansas, New Mexico, Oklahoma, Utah, and Wyoming. New Mexico is the only state in the circuit where same-sex marriage was legal prior to the decisions. Utah is the only state in the circuit where same-sex marriage was temporarily legal after its ban was struck down. A ruling requiring the state of Utah to recognize same-sex marriages performed within the state was temporarily stayed and was originally set to expire on July 21, 2014, at 8:00 a.m. The Supreme Court of the United States extended the stay on July 18, 2014.

A federal judge struck down Colorado's same-sex marriage ban and issued a temporary stay that was set to expire on August 25 at 8:00 a.m. but was later extended. The same-sex marriage ban was also struck down in Colorado by a state district court judge and was stayed pending appeal. Following the circuit court ruling, licenses were issued in Boulder County, Colorado. Attorney General John Suthers declared that they would be invalid. After a state district court judge refused, on July 10, 2014, to order the clerk to stop issuing the licenses, the Denver County clerk's office began issuing licenses to same-sex couples as well. The clerk of Pueblo County began issuing licenses to same-sex couples the next day. The Colorado Supreme Court ordered clerks in Denver and Adams counties not to issue marriage licenses to same-sex couples even though Adams County didn't issue any marriage licenses to same-sex couples. On July 21, 2014, it was announced that Pueblo County would stop issuing marriage licenses to same-sex couples, yet Boulder County continued to issue licenses. On July 29, 2014, the Colorado Supreme Court ordered the clerk in Boulder County not to issue marriage licenses to same-sex couples.

On October 6, 2014, the U.S. Supreme Court rejected petitions for certiorari from five states where same-sex marriage bans had been struck down, including Utah and Oklahoma. The same day, the Tenth Circuit dissolved the stays it had previously issued on its rulings allowing for same-sex marriages in those states.

On October 7, the Tenth Circuit lifted its own stay, at the request of state officials, on the case Burns v. Hickenlooper which struck down Colorado's same-sex marriage ban, legalizing same-sex marriage throughout all of Colorado. The Colorado Supreme Court also dissolved stays against several county clerks who were prohibited from issuing marriage licenses to same-sex couples.

On November 4, 2014, a preliminary injunction barring the Secretary of the Kansas Department of Health and Environment, Douglas County and Sedgwick County from enforcing Kansas's same-sex marriage ban was issued. The Kansas attorney general contended that Crabtree's preliminary injunction only applied to the two counties and one state official involved in the lawsuit. However, many counties began issuing marriage licenses to same-sex couples on their own initiative. The state government refused to recognize same-sex marriages until July 6, 2015, after the Supreme Court of the United States' landmark ruled in Obergefell v. Hodges on June 26, 2015. By June 30, 2015, all 31 judicial districts and all 105 Kansas counties were issuing licenses to same-sex couples or had agreed to do so. All states and all but one territory are complying with the ruling, which set a precedent that same-sex marriage bans are unconstitutional. Kansas was the last state in the country to recognize same-sex marriages.

Status of same-sex marriage

See also
Same-sex marriage
Same-sex marriage in the United States
Same-sex marriage in the Fourth Circuit
Same-sex marriage in the Ninth Circuit
Same-sex marriage in the Seventh Circuit
Same-sex marriage in the Sixth Circuit

References

United States Court of Appeals for the Tenth Circuit
10